Le Guichet station (French: Gare du Guichet) is one of the two RER stations of Orsay, near Paris, in France. It is also the name of a district of this town.

This station is built on a bridge, above the national road 118.
It serves Orsay and a large part of the scientific organisation that can be found near by, such as the ones in the plateau de Saclay (CNRS, school of CentraleSupélec).

Réseau Express Régional stations
Railway stations in Essonne
Railway stations in France opened in 1854